Mixed music is music combining acoustic instruments and fixed-media electronics (e.g concrete sounds, sound-file playback etc) or more generally, music which combines acoustic-instrumental and electronic sounds sources (to the exclusion of electrically amplified instruments, such as the electric guitar and electronic instruments such as the theremin,  electronic organs & keyboards, etc); mixed music is therefore a subcategory of electronic music. While this term could be applied to many genres, the term mixed music generally refers to contemporary classical music repertoire and is therefore distinct from live electronic music.

The term Mixed music is probably a calque of the French musique mixte which connotes the same material and stylistic implications.

History

Significant early works
Edgar Varèse Déserts (1954) for 14 winds (brass and woodwinds), 5 percussionists, piano & magnetic-tape playback
Iannis Xenakis Analogique A et B (1959) for three violins, three cellos, three contrabasses & magnetic-tape playback
Luigi Nono La Fabbrica illuminata (1964) for soprano & magnetic-tape playback

Associated institutions & significant works
A number of institutions have been key in the evolution of technologies pertinent to the creation of mixed music:

 L'Institut de Recherche et Coordination Acoustique/Musique (IRCAM), Paris
 Boulez, Pierre Répons (1981, revised 1984) for six soloists, chamber orchestra, and live-electronics
 Boulez, Pierre Dialogue de l'ombre double (1985) for clarinet & fixed-media playback
 Manoury, Philippe Jupiter (1987) for flute & live-electronics
 Manoury, Philippe En Echo (1993–94) for soprano & live-electronics
 Boulez, Pierre …explosante-fixe… (1993) version for midi-flute, two solo flutes chamber ensemble & live-electronics
 Experimentalstudio des SWR, Freiburg
 Nono, Luigi Prometeo (1981, revised 1985) for five vocal soloists, two speakers, choir, orchestra & combined live-electronics & fixed-media playback
 Studio for Electronic Music Westdeutscher Rundfunk, Cologne
 Stockhausen, Karlheinz Kontakte (1960) for piano, percussion & fixed-media playback
 Stockhausen, Karlheinz Mixtur (1964) for orchestra, four sine-wave generators & four ring-modulators
 Stockhausen, Karlheinz Mikrophonie I (1964) for two tam-tams & microphones with band-pass filters
 Stockhausen, Karlheinz Mikrophonie II (1965) for twelve singers, Hammond organ, four ring-modulators & fixed-media playback
 Stockhausen, Karlheinz Hymnen (1969), version for orchestra & fixed-media playback
 Stockhausen, Karlheinz Mantra (1970) for two pianos with ring-modulation
 Center for Computer Research in Music and Acoustics (CCRMA), Stanford
  Center for New Music and Audio Technologies (CNMAT), Berkeley
 Columbia-Princeton Electronic Music Center, New York

Suggested further reading

Puckette, Miller The Theory and Technique of Electronic Music, May 23, 2007; World Scientific Publishing Company (978-9812700773)
Schaeffer, Pierre In Search of a Concrete Music, January 8, 2013; University of California Press (978-0520265745)

References

Electronic music
20th-century music genres